The 2009 FIBA Under-19 World Championship (Maori: 2009 FIBA I-Raro I Te 19 Tau Toa o Te Ao) was the 9th edition of the FIBA U19 World Championship, the biennial international men's youth basketball championship contested by the U19 national teams of the member associations of FIBA. It was held in Auckland, New Zealand from 2 to 12 July 2009.

Venues

Qualified teams

Groups

Preliminary round

Times given below are in New Zealand Standard Time (UTC+12).

Group A

Group B

Group C

Group D

Eighth-final round
Times given below are in New Zealand Standard Time (UTC+12).

Results between preliminary groupmates carry over.

Group E

Group F

Knockout round

Championship

5th–8th playoffs

9th–12th playoffs

13th–16th playoffs

Quarterfinals

Semifinals

Finals

Final standings

Awards

All-Tournament Team

  Toni Prostran
  Tyshawn Taylor
  Nikos Pappas
  Gordon Hayward
  Mario Delaš

Statistical leaders

Points

Rebounds

Assists

Steals

Blocks

External links
 Official website

2009
2009 in basketball
2009 in New Zealand basketball
International basketball competitions hosted by New Zealand
Sport in Auckland